Jake Delaney and Marc Polmans were the defending champions, however both players were no longer eligible to play juniors.

Alex de Minaur and Blake Ellis won the title, defeating Lukáš Klein and Patrik Rikl in the final, 3–6, 7–5, [12–10].

Seeds

Draw

Finals

Top half

Bottom half

References 

Draw

Boys' Doubles
2016